Witches cauldron or variations may refer to:

Places
 Witches Cauldron (Antarctica), a basin on Douglas Range, Alexander Island, Antarctica
 A crater at the top of Wizard Island in Crater Lake National Park, Oregon
 A basin at the base of Devils Thumb mountain on the Alaska–British Columbia border
 A mythological location from the saga of King Laurin

Other uses
 Witches cauldron mushroom (Sarcosoma globosum), a species of fungus
 Witch's Cauldron, a 1985 videogame by Mikro-Gen
 Witch's Cauldron, a 1933 novel by Eden Phillpotts
 "The Witch's Cauldron", an episode of Sasami: Magical Girls Club 
 A brand of beer by Moorhouse's Brewery
 A horse foaled by Brownhylda in 1926
 A feature in the horror comic book anthology series The Haunt of Fear

See also
 
 
 
 Cauldron (disambiguation)
 Witch (disambiguation)
 The Black Cauldron (disambiguation)
 A Cauldron of Witches, a 1988 anthology of fairy tales
 Hexenkessel ('Witch's cauldron'), a 2003 album by Schandmaul 
 Heksenketel ('Witch's cauldron'), a 1993 documentary film by The Tragically Hip
 Heksegryta Peaks ('Witch Cauldron' Peaks), a mountain group in Queen Maud Land, Antarctica
 Cast-iron cookware, including cast-iron cauldrons